Kozhino is the name of several rural localities in Russia.

Modern localities

Kirov Oblast
As of 2012, one rural locality in Kirov Oblast bears this name:
Kozhino, Kirov Oblast, a village in Gostovsky Rural Okrug of Shabalinsky District;

Moscow Oblast
As of 2012, four rural localities in Moscow Oblast bear this name:
Kozhino, Mozhaysky District, Moscow Oblast, a village in Poretskoye Rural Settlement of Mozhaysky District
Kozhino (rural locality), Dorokhovskoye Rural Settlement, Ruzsky District, Moscow Oblast, a settlement in Dorokhovskoye Rural Settlement of Ruzsky District
Kozhino (rural locality), Dorokhovskoye Rural Settlement, Ruzsky District, Moscow Oblast, a village in Dorokhovskoye Rural Settlement of Ruzsky District
Kozhino, Staroruzskoye Rural Settlement, Ruzsky District, Moscow Oblast, a village in Staroruzskoye Rural Settlement of Ruzsky District

Nizhny Novgorod Oblast
As of 2012, two rural localities in Nizhny Novgorod Oblast bear this name:
Kozhino, Arzamassky District, Nizhny Novgorod Oblast, a selo in Berezovsky Selsoviet of Arzamassky District
Kozhino, Lyskovsky District, Nizhny Novgorod Oblast, a village in Kislovsky Selsoviet of Lyskovsky District

Novgorod Oblast
As of 2012, one rural locality in Novgorod Oblast bears this name:
Kozhino, Novgorod Oblast, a village in Molvotitskoye Settlement of Maryovsky District

Perm Krai
As of 2012, one rural locality in Perm Krai bears this name:
Kozhino, Perm Krai, a village in Bolshesosnovsky District

Pskov Oblast
As of 2012, six rural localities in Pskov Oblast bear this name:
Kozhino (Porechenskoye Rural Settlement), Bezhanitsky District, Pskov Oblast, a village in Bezhanitsky District; municipally, a part of Porechenskoye Rural Settlement of that district
Kozhino (Kudeverskaya Rural Settlement), Bezhanitsky District, Pskov Oblast, a village in Bezhanitsky District; municipally, a part of Kudeverskaya Rural Settlement of that district
Kozhino, Kunyinsky District, Pskov Oblast, a village in Kunyinsky District
Kozhino (Berezhanskaya Rural Settlement), Ostrovsky District, Pskov Oblast, a village in Ostrovsky District; municipally, a part of Berezhanskaya Rural Settlement of that district
Kozhino (Volkovskaya Rural Settlement), Ostrovsky District, Pskov Oblast, a village in Ostrovsky District; municipally, a part of Volkovskaya Rural Settlement of that district
Kozhino, Pushkinogorsky District, Pskov Oblast, a village in Pushkinogorsky District

Smolensk Oblast
As of 2012, three rural localities in Smolensk Oblast bear this name:
Kozhino, Gagarinsky District, Smolensk Oblast, a village in Nikolskoye Rural Settlement of Gagarinsky District
Kozhino, Monastyrshchinsky District, Smolensk Oblast, a village in Sobolevskoye Rural Settlement of Monastyrshchinsky District
Kozhino, Novoduginsky District, Smolensk Oblast, a village in Tesovskoye Rural Settlement of Novoduginsky District

Tula Oblast
As of 2012, one rural locality in Tula Oblast bears this name:
Kozhino, Tula Oblast, a village in Zaytsevsky Rural Okrug of Leninsky District

Tver Oblast
As of 2012, four rural localities in Tver Oblast bear this name:
Kozhino, Kashinsky District, Tver Oblast, a village in Davydovskoye Rural Settlement of Kashinsky District
Kozhino, Maksatikhinsky District, Tver Oblast, a village in Seletskoye Rural Settlement of Maksatikhinsky District
Kozhino, Udomelsky District, Tver Oblast, a village in Mstinskoye Rural Settlement of Udomelsky District
Kozhino, Vyshnevolotsky District, Tver Oblast, a village in Yesenovichskoye Rural Settlement of Vyshnevolotsky District

Vladimir Oblast
As of 2012, two rural localities in Vladimir Oblast bear this name:
Kozhino, Gorokhovetsky District, Vladimir Oblast, a village in Gorokhovetsky District
Kozhino, Kolchuginsky District, Vladimir Oblast, a village in Kolchuginsky District

Vologda Oblast
As of 2012, five rural localities in Vologda Oblast bear this name:
Kozhino, Oktyabrsky Selsoviet, Vologodsky District, Vologda Oblast, a village in Oktyabrsky Selsoviet of Vologodsky District
Kozhino, Podlesny Selsoviet, Vologodsky District, Vologda Oblast, a village in Podlesny Selsoviet of Vologodsky District
Kozhino, Pudegsky Selsoviet, Vologodsky District, Vologda Oblast, a village in Pudegsky Selsoviet of Vologodsky District
Kozhino, Pudegsky Selsoviet, Vologodsky District, Vologda Oblast, a village in Pudegsky Selsoviet of Vologodsky District
Kozhino, Vytegorsky District, Vologda Oblast, a village in Tudozersky Selsoviet of Vytegorsky District

Yaroslavl Oblast
As of 2012, one rural locality in Yaroslavl Oblast bears this name:
Kozhino, Yaroslavl Oblast, a village in Bogorodsky Rural Okrug of Myshkinsky District

Abolished localities
Kozhino, Kostroma Oblast, a village in Zadorinsky Selsoviet of Parfenyevsky District in Kostroma Oblast; abolished on October 18, 2004

References

Notes

Sources